Stornoway Communications is a privately held Canadian broadcasting and production company based in Toronto, Ontario.

Stornoway owns two production arms called Stornoway Productions and Stornoway Films;  Stornoway Productions produces various in-depth documentaries while Stornoway Films produce dramas and other entertainment programs.

Former broadcasting assets
 bpm:tv; a specialty channel devoted to dance music and dance lifestyle. The channel ceased operations on June 1, 2015.
 ichannel; a public, social and current affairs channel.  The channel ceased operations on August 15, 2016.
 The Pet Network; a specialty channel devoted to pets.  The channel ceased operations on May 2, 2016.

References

External links
 Stornoway Communications
 Stornoway Productions
 CRTC chart of Stornoway Communications' assets

Companies based in Toronto
Television broadcasting companies of Canada
Television production companies of Canada